Filimonas zeae is a Gram-negative, aerobic and motile bacterium from the genus of Filimonas which has been isolated from the roots of a maize-plant from the Beijing in China.

References

Chitinophagia
Bacteria described in 2016